The Collegiate Peaks Scenic Byway is a  Colorado Scenic and Historic Byway located in Chaffee and Lake counties, Colorado, US. The Byway follows the upper Arkansas River past the Collegiate Peaks, featuring eight of the highest peaks in the Rocky Mountains.

Mountain Peaks
Mount Shavano 
Mount Antero 
Mount Princeton 
Mount Yale 
Mount Harvard 
Mount Belford 
Mount Oxford 
Mount Elbert

See also
History Colorado
List of scenic byways in Colorado
Scenic byways in the United States

References

External links
America's Scenic Byways: Colorado
Colorado Department of Transportation
Colorado Scenic & Historic Byways Commission
Colorado Scenic & Historic Byways
Colorado Travel Map
Colorado Tourism Office
History Colorado

Colorado Scenic and Historic Byways
San Isabel National Forest
Transportation in Colorado
Transportation in Chaffee County, Colorado
Transportation in Lake County, Colorado
Tourist attractions in Colorado
Tourist attractions in Chaffee County, Colorado
Tourist attractions in Lake County, Colorado
U.S. Route 24
U.S. Route 50
U.S. Route 285